Donald Smith (born 6 September 1963) is a Trinidad and Tobago boxer. He competed in the men's light heavyweight event at the 1984 Summer Olympics.

References

External links
 

1963 births
Living people
Trinidad and Tobago male boxers
Olympic boxers of Trinidad and Tobago
Boxers at the 1984 Summer Olympics
Place of birth missing (living people)
Light-heavyweight boxers